KIDG is a commercial radio station located in Pocatello, Idaho, broadcasting on 92.1 FM. KIDG airs a news/talk format, simulcast with KIDJ (106.3 FM) in Sugar City and formerly originated on KID (590 AM) in Idaho Falls. The call letters were changed from KPPC to KEGE on March 7, 2008, to match the station's previous "Edge" branding and then changed to KIDG on December 7, 2015.

External links

IDG
Radio stations established in 2009
2009 establishments in Idaho
News and talk radio stations in the United States